Barbara Krug (born 6 May 1956, in Leipzig) is a retired East German sprinter who specialized in the 400 metres.

At the 1978 European Championships she won a gold medal in the 4 × 400 m relay, together with teammates Christiane Marquardt, Christina Lathan and Marita Koch. Krug then finished fourth at the 1979 European Indoor Championships.

Krug, Lathan and Koch remained on the relay team for the 1980 Summer Olympics, with Gabriele Löwe replacing Christiane Marquardt. The team won the Olympic silver medal in 4 × 400 m relay.

Krug competed for the club SC DHfK Leipzig during her active career.

References

Sources
 Dictionary of Women Worldwide. 25,000 women through the ages. Three volumes. Edited by Anne Commire. Waterford, CT: Yorkin Publications, 2007.

1956 births
Living people
East German female sprinters
Athletes (track and field) at the 1980 Summer Olympics
Olympic athletes of East Germany
Olympic silver medalists for East Germany
Athletes from Leipzig
European Athletics Championships medalists
Medalists at the 1980 Summer Olympics
Olympic silver medalists in athletics (track and field)
Olympic female sprinters